Yeronga was an electoral district of the Legislative Assembly in the Australian state of Queensland from 1950 to 2001.

The district was based in the southern suburbs of Brisbane and named for the suburb of Yeronga.

Members for Yeronga

Election results

See also
 Electoral districts of Queensland
 Members of the Queensland Legislative Assembly by year
 :Category:Members of the Queensland Legislative Assembly by name

References

Former electoral districts of Queensland